Space Cowboy is a French-British DJ and producer. He has released four studio album, two extended plays, five singles, and one music video.

Space Cowboy released his first official single, a cover of Prince's song, "I Would Die 4 U" on 1 January 2002. The single peaked at number 55 on the UK Singles Chart. This was the only single from his first album, Across the Sky that was released on 3 November 2003 though Southern Fried Records and Epic Japan. Then another single was released, "Just Put Your Hand in Mine", on 21 July 2003. This song peaked on the UK Singles Chart at number 71. His second album, released through Sony Music Entertainment Japan and Epic Japan, Big City Nights was released on 22 June 2005. His third studio album, Digital Rock was released on 19 July 2006 though Sony and Tiger Trax. Space Cowboy's third, fourth, and fifth singles, "My Egyptian Lover", "Falling Down", and "I Came 2 Party", was released throughout 2009 to debut his fourth studio album, Digital Rock Star that was released on 20 October 2009 by Universal Music Group, Cherrytree Records, Interscope Records, and Tiger Trax. In 2010, Electro Pioneers (Interscope, Tiger Trax), the second extended play, was released on 12 January 2010.

Space Cowboy is known to be the DJ for Lady Gaga. He was featured on and co-produced "Starstruck" for her album The Fame. The two also collaborated on the promotional single "Christmas Tree". He also remixed some of Lady Gaga's songs, including "Just Dance", "LoveGame", and "Poker Face". He also worked with her on her second album The Fame Monster, co-writing and producing the tracks "Monster" and "So Happy I Could Die" with Lady Gaga and RedOne. Space Cowboy appeared in the Lady Gaga music videos for "Just Dance", "Beautiful, Dirty, Rich", and "Poker Face".

He also produced two albums by Nadia Oh, Hot Like Wow and Colours.

He also co-wrote the MSTRKRFT song "Heartbreaker" featuring American singer John Legend.

Albums

Studio albums

Compilation albums

Extended plays

Singles

Production discography
Also contains co-productions and co-writes

Albums

Songs

Remixes

Music videos

References

Discographies of French artists